Kushi ( Happiness) is a 2001 Indian Telugu-language romantic comedy film written and directed by S. J. Suryah. It is a remake of his own Tamil-language film of the same name, the film stars Pawan Kalyan and Bhumika Chawla. Mani Sharma provided the score and soundtrack.

The film was released on 27 April 2001. It was a major commercial success, grossing 19crores the box office.

Plot 
The film opens when Madhu and Siddhu are born. Madhu's family is based in Kaikaluru of Andhra Pradesh and Siddhu's family is from Kolkata. As babies, Madhu and Siddhu meet in a shopping complex.

Madhu and her father love each other dearly. Madhu's father wants her daughter to get married and wanted to keep his son-in-law with them and so that his daughter will not leave him. However, her groom elopes with his girlfriend, apologizing to Madhu that he did not want to ruin another girl's life.

Siddhu receives a visa for higher studies in Canada, his car met with an accident on his way to airport, which results him hospitalized for a period. Coincidentally, he receives Madhu's blood. Madhu's convinces her father to go for higher studies and not be bothered with marriage. Sidhu cannot make it to Canada and joins the same college as Madhu. Incidentally, they meet in a temple. They become good friends, while also helping Madhu's friend, Shanti, and Siddu's friend, Babu, who are in love. Shanti's father is a big goon, and Madhu and Siddhu ensure that Shanti and Babu do not reveal their love to Shanti's father and get into any trouble. One day while Madhu is studying for exams, Siddhu happens to come. Madhu's sari moves in the breeze, revealing her navel. Siddhu ogles it. Madhu accuses Siddhu of ogling, and Siddhu denies it. An argument breaks out leading to them accusing each other of hiding their feelings for the other. They end their friendship.

After the summer holidays, Shanti's dad finds out about Babu. Madhu and Siddhu meet again for the sake of their friend's love. In the course of getting Babu and Shanti together, they realize they love each other. They try to confess each other but they miss still they manage to give their co-passengers the letter they read each other letters. 10 years later, Madhu and Siddu are married with 17 children including one triplets and others twins. They are interviewed for their Guinness Record of having 17 kids in 10 years.

Cast

Production
S. J. Suryah first narrated the script to Pawan Kalyan when they considered Jyothika and Ameesha Patel for the Tamil version. While Jyothika committed more Tamil films, Kalyan and Patel were shooting for Badri (2000) during that time. Kalyan who immediately accepted the film postponed his other commitments and gave preference to Kushi.As Kalyan insisted on additional fight sequences in the film, Suryah asked Kalyan to direct them as he did not feel them necessary to the story. Kalyan also went on to direct three songs, namely, "Ye Mera Jahan," "Premante Suluvu Kaaduraa" and "Aaduvari Matalaku." The introduction song of the actress in the Tamil version was also replaced to accommodate the protagonist's introduction.

Years later, Suryah narrated the sequel's storyline to Kalyan but the plans were dropped as Kalyan became busy in politics.

Soundtrack
Mani Sharma composed the soundtrack of the film. The audio was released in CDs for the time in Telugu along with cassettes by Aditya Music. The song "Cheliya Cheliya" is inspired from Santana's "Maria Maria". A classic song called "Aaduvari Maatalaku", written by Pingali from the film Missamma, was remixed by Mani Sharma with vocals by Murali. Other lyricists are A.M. Ratnam, Abbas Tyrewala, Chandra Bose, Pingali and Suddala Ashok Teja. 

 Release Kushi was released on 27 April 2001. It was dubbed in Hindi as Humjoli. The film was again re-released  on 31 December 2022 in 4k.

 Reception 

Critical receptionIdlebrain.com rated the film 4.5/5 and called it a "One man show" of Pawan Kalyan. The reviewer also appreciated the screenplay by SJ Suryah. Sify rated the film 3/5 and also called it "an out and out Pavan Kalyan film, which totally depends on his larger than life image".

 Box office Kushi'' was successful at the box office. The film had a 50-day theatrical run in 101 centres and a 100-day run in 79 centres. Full run share Around  19 crore at the box office by the end of its theatrical run.

Awards and nominations

References

External links 
 

2000s Telugu-language films
2001 films
2001 romantic comedy films
Films directed by S. J. Suryah
Films scored by Mani Sharma
Films set in Hyderabad, India
Films set in Kolkata
Films shot in Hyderabad, India
Films shot in Kolkata
Indian romantic comedy films
Films set in Andhra Pradesh